Pang Tsz Kin (born 16 December 1986) is a former Hong Kong professional footballer who played as a goalkeeper.

Club career
Pang played for Tai Po, Happy Valley, Yuen Long and Dream Metro Gallery.

Tai Po
He started his career at Wofoo Tai Po FC, staying at the club for 4 seasons.

Happy Valley
He then signed for Happy Valley for the 2013–14 Hong Kong First Division League.

Yuen Long
After a season with Happy Valley, Pang signed for Yuen Long FC.

Metro Gallery
In 2015, he signed for Metro Gallery.

Yuen Long
He returned to the club after 2 years.

Lee Man
On 17 July 2018, Pang was announced as a Lee Man player ahead of the 2018–19 season. He made his competitive debut on 30 September 2018 against Hoi King with a win and a clean sheet.

International career
Pang was part of the Hong Kong squad where they took part in the 2017 Guangdong–Hong Kong Cup on 1 and 4 January 2017.

Honours
Tai Po
Hong Kong Senior Shield: 2012–13

Lee Man
 Hong Kong Sapling Cup: 2018–19

Yuen Long
Hong Kong Senior Shield: 2017–18

References

External links

Pang Tsz Kin at HKFA

1986 births
Living people
Hong Kong people
Hong Kong footballers
Hong Kong Premier League players
Yuen Long FC players
Lee Man FC players
Association football goalkeepers